Lisaa is a 2019 Indian Tamil stereoscopic horror film written and directed by Raju Viswanath on his directorial debut. The film stars Anjali, Sam Jones and Makarand Deshpande. (in his Tamil debut). This film is India's first ever stereoscopic 3D horror film. This film is a uncredited remake from The Visit.  The film opened to mixed reviews.

Plot 
Lisaa (Anjali) decides to meet her grandparents and get a nod from them for her single mother’s (Kalyani Natarajan) second marriage. As Lisaa is planning to leave to the US, she wants her mother to have a companion and hence, insists her to remarry.

However, Lisaa’s mother says that her husband unexpectedly lost his life only because she married him without the consent of her parents. Now Lisaa, along with her friend Jagadeesh (Sam Jones) go on a five-day trip to the Western Ghats to convince her grandparents.

From the beginning, Lisaa and Jaggu find that the former’s grandparents behave abnormally. They both think that their grandparents are ghosts, but actually they are psychos, and not her real grandparents. Then the psycho grandpa, starts chasing lisa, to a shed where he tries to kill her, but Sharada, who is Lisa's real grandma, saves Lisa. Finally the police catch the psycho grandpa, who tells them that he kills children who disrespect their parents as his own son had done to him. It also turns out that the psycho grandpa was in an old age home, where the owner had been evicted, and so they travelled to lisa's grandparents house to ask for donations, where they found the old couples dead in each others hands, and the psycho grandpa and grandma, take their place.

Cast 

 Anjali as Lisaa
 Sam Jones as Jagadeesh (Jaggu)
 Makarand Deshpande as Dhananjayan / Raghavan
 Brahmanandam as LKG, Jaggu's father
 Surekha Vani as Jaggu's mother
 Kalyani Natarajan as Lisaa's mother
 Saleema as Saradha / Nancy
 Yogi Babu as Priest
 Mime Gopi as Shankar
 Sabbita Roi

Production 
The film was announced by debutant director Raju Viswanath and revealed that the film will be woman oriented thriller based genre starring Anjali in the main lead. The filming began during July 2018 with most of the scenes of the film were shot in Kodaikanal and Hyderabad. The scenes with Brahmanandam and Surekha Vani were shot in Telugu. The film was also dubbed in Hindi. The portions of the film were cranked using Helium 8K camera with the film made using 3D technology.

Soundtrack 
The soundtrack was composed by Santhosh Dhayanidhi.

Reception
The film received mixed reviews from critics. Times of India wrote "With cardboard characters and storytelling that lacks depth, even 3D doesn’t save this good script." India Today wrote "Anjali's Lisaa abounds with jump scares and insipid comic scenes. Debutant director Raju Viswanath has a decent premise." Sify wrote "It’s quite evident that debutant director Raju Viswanath has touched the untold stories of the elder citizen added an emotional ending along with a supernatural angle to serve it as the typical Tamil horror thriller, which ends with a preachy social message."

References

External links 

 

2010s Tamil-language films
2019 horror films
Indian drama films
Indian 3D films
Films shot in Hyderabad, India
Films shot in Kodaikanal
2019 directorial debut films
2019 films
2019 3D films